Mirra Bank is a director of film, television, and theater. She is a member of the Documentary Branch of the Academy of Motion Pictures. Her documentary, “Last Dance,” was short-listed for an Academy Award. Variety called Bank's documentary, "The Only Real Game", about the popularity of baseball in war-torn Indian state of Manipur, a "clear-eyed snapshot of sports hope struggling against socioeconomic stagnation." Banks is a past President of New York Women in Film and Television and currently serves on their advisory board.

References

American women film directors
Living people
Year of birth missing (living people)
21st-century American women